Vadim Korobov (born 6 July 1997) is a Lithuanian sprint canoeist.

In 2021 and 2022 Korobov won bronze and silver medals respectively at the Canoe Sprint European Championships in Men's C2-200 m event.

References

External links

1997 births
Lithuanian male canoeists
Living people
Canoeists at the 2019 European Games
Canoeists at the 2014 Summer Youth Olympics
European Games competitors for Lithuania